Rutheniridosmine is a naturally occurring mineral alloy of the elements ruthenium, iridium and osmium with the formula of . Rutheniridosmine occurs as hexagonal, opaque, silver-white, metallic grains with a Mohs hardness of six. Platinum, palladium, rhodium, iron, and nickel occur as impurities.

Rutheniridosmine occurs in association with sperrylite, hollingworthite, iridarsenite, ruthenarsenite, michenerite, laurite, geversite, moncheite, and chromite.

Type localities include: the Ruby Creek, Spruce Creek, and Bullion mines of British Columbia, Canada and the Horokanai placer deposit, of Kamikawa Subprefecture, Hokkaidō, Japan.

References

Native element minerals
Ruthenium compounds
Osmium compounds
Iridium compounds
Precious metal alloys